John Ernst Leigh was an Ambassador for Sierra Leone to the United States who served during the Sierra Leone Civil War. Leigh was also a Presidential candidate for the Sierra Leone People's Party during the 2007 Presidential elections in Sierra Leone.

Family Background
John Leigh grew up in Cline Town, Sierra Leone, and alongside his other brother Frederick, attended Albert Academy in Freetown. John Leigh was the son of a Sierra Leonean father of Creole descent and a Mende Sierra Leonean mother. John Leigh's father, Evelyn Leslie Foy Leigh was a civil servant and his family descended from the original Nova Scotian Settlers.

References

Ambassadors of Sierra Leone to the United States
Sierra Leone Creole people